Johann Duhaupas (pronounced yoh-hun doo-uh-paw) (born 5 February 1981) is a French professional boxer who challenged for the WBC heavyweight title in 2015. At regional level he has held multiple heavyweight titles, including the European Union title from 2013 to 2014.

Professional career

Early career
Johann Duhaupas began his pro career in 2004. In 2008, with an undefeated record of 17–0, Duhaupas faced another undefeated boxer, Italian Francesco Pianeta. He lost the fight by a unanimous decision.

On 14 March 2015 Duhaupas was defeated by the German boxer Erkan Teper by a twelve round unanimous decision. Despite the loss, Duhaupas looked very good, took Teper's best shots and gave him his hardest fight of his career.

27 days later, on 10 April 2015 Duhaupas faced the future regular WBA heavyweight champion Manuel Charr in Moscow, Russia and beat him by a 10 round decision.

Duhaupas vs. Wilder

Duhaupas faced hard hitting Deontay Wilder for the WBC World heavyweight title on 26 September 2015 in Birmingham, Alabama. He was outboxed, suffering severe swelling and sustaining cuts, and was stopped in the eleventh round after being hit with several unanswered blows.

Duhaupas vs. Helenius

On 2 April 2016 Duhaupas traveled to Finland to take on undefeated Robert Helenius. Duhaupas was brought in as an underdog but instead he dominated Helenius and gave him his first career loss. Duhaupas dropped him twice prior to knockout in the sixth round.

Duhaupas vs. Povetkin

On a day's notice Duhaupas took on the fight against Russian fighter Alexander Povetkin, replacing the former WBC heavyweight champion Bermane Stiverne, who pulled out of the fight after learning that Povetkin tested positive for the banned substance ostarine and that the World Boxing Council wouldn’t sanction the fight. Povetkin hurt Duhaupas with two left hooks to the head in round 6 to knock him down and out. The fight was halted by the referee, as Duhaupas was badly hurt from the left hands. The official time of the stoppage was at 2:59 of the 6th round.

Duhaupas vs. Miller

Following the Povetkin loss, Duhaupas knocked out three low-level opponents in 2017. He faced undefeated American Jarrell Miller on 28 April 2018, in New York. Duhaupas lost the bout via unanimous decision 119–109, 119–109, and 117–111.

In his next fight, Duhaupas fought and defeated Luis Pascual with a second round knockout in a scheduled eight-rounder.

Professional boxing record

References

External links
 
 Johann Duhaupas - Profile, News Archive & Current Rankings at Box.Live

1981 births
Living people
French male boxers
European Boxing Union champions
Sportspeople from Abbeville
Heavyweight boxers